Kenney Funderburk (born April 13, 1992) is an American professional basketball player who plays for CSM Ploiești of the  Liga Națională. He played college basketball at Columbus State from 2013 to 2015.

College career
As a senior at Columbus State in 2014-15 Funderburk averaged 19.3 points, 3.1 rebounds and 2.8 assists in 33.4 minutes in 30 appearances.

Professional career
In the season 2017/18 he played for Korihait in Finland. On October 6, 2018, he made his debut for Feni Industries scoring 15 points, 6 rebounds and 10 assist in a 68-86 away win against Pelister. On April 2, 2019, he signed with Macedonian basketball club Blokotehna.
On June 30, 2019, he signed with Slovak basketball club Inter Bratislava where the season was canceled early in March 2020 because of the outbreak of COVID pandemic. 
In 2020-2021 season Kenney played in Hungary for PVSK Panthers based in Pécs. The team took 11th place in the league. 
Most recently, during season 2021-2022, Kenney was playing for Ironi Kiryat Ata in Israel and together with his team became the Champions of Liga Leumit (basketball) on 20 May, 2022.

References

External links
Eurobasket.com Profile
Frenchbasketballscouting Profile
ESPN Profile

1992 births
Living people
American expatriate basketball people in Finland
American expatriate basketball people in North Macedonia
American expatriate basketball people in Ukraine
Basketball players from Charlotte, North Carolina
BC Kyiv players
BC Odesa players
Columbus State Cougars men's basketball players
Guards (basketball)
Junior college men's basketball players in the United States